Sumpter Smith Joint National Guard Base  is a United States Air Force (USAF) installation located at a Birmingham, Alabama in the United States. It hosts the 117th Air Refueling Wing, part of the Air National Guard, which operates the KC-135R Stratotanker. The base was previously known as Alabama Air National Guard Base.

History 

The base is named after United States Army Air Forces Colonel Walter Sumpter Smith who was born on 12 February 12 1896 in Belle Ellen, Alabama and became an electrical engineer and a pilot. In 1921, Smith was appointed to the 106th Observation Squadron of the Alabama National Guard and commissioned as a first lieutenant at Roberts Field in Birmingham, Alabama. He reached the rank of lieutenant colonel on August 12, 1932 and colonel in 1942.

In 1934, the facilities at Roberts Field became less adequate and the local government decided to build a new facility which became Birmingham Municipal Airport. In 1938, after four years of construction, the 106th Observation Squadron moved to the new base.

As a testimony to Smith’s role in the development and construction, the base was eventually named Sumpter Smith Joint National Guard Base. It remained that way until sometime during the early 1990s when the name evolved to the Alabama Air National Guard Base, Birmingham, Alabama. It’s not really clear why the name changed and no official documents have been found. A push was made to restore the name of the base to Sumpter Smith Air National Guard Base and was made official during the summer of 2017.

Based units 
Flying and notable non-flying units based at Sumpter Smith Joint National Guard Base. 

Units marked GSU are Geographically Separate Units, which although based at Sumpter Smith, are subordinate to a parent unit based at another location.

United States Air Force 
Air National Guard

 Alabama Air National Guard
 117th Air Refueling Wing (Host Wing)
 117th Operations Group
 106th Air Refueling Squadron – KC-135R Stratotanker
 117th Maintenance Group
 117th Medical Group
 117th Mission Support Group

Air Mobility Command

 Eighteenth Air Force
 6th Air Refueling Wing
 6th Operations Group
 99th Air Refueling Squadron (GSU) – KC-135R Stratotanker

See also 

List of United States Air Force installations

References

Installations of the United States Air Force in Alabama
Airfields of the United States Army Air Forces in Alabama
Installations of the United States Air National Guard
Birmingham–Shuttlesworth International Airport